Trimezia northiana, synonym Neomarica northiana, also known as North's false flag or walking iris, is a flowering plant, native to Brazil, with a rhizomatous rootstock, belonging to the iris family, Iridaceae.

Reproduction
Plantlets grow at the ends of the flower stalks. As the plantlets grow, their weight causes the stalk to dip to the ground where they take root.

Gallery

References

northiana
Endemic flora of Brazil
Garden plants
Plants described in 1928